Sujata Sharma is an Indian structural biologist, biophysicist, writer and a professor at the Department of Biophysics of the All India Institute of Medical Sciences, Delhi. She is known for her studies in the fields of protein structure, drug design and drug resistance of bacteria. Her studies have been documented by way of a number of articles and ResearchGate, an online repository of scientific articles has listed 167 of them.
She is also the author of the books, "Warriors in White", an autobiographical account of some COVID-19 Warriors at All India Institute of Medical Sciences, Delhi and other leading hospitals of India, including Prof Randeep Guleria, using a combination of modern medicine, astronomy and Vedic astrology, "The Secret of the Red Crystals", an autobiographical account of her days in AIIMS Delhi.  and "A Dragonfly's purpose", which is an autobiographical account of her recovery from an autoimmune disease, Guillain Barre Syndrome.
The Department of Biotechnology of the Government of India awarded her the National Bioscience Award for Career Development, one of the highest Indian science awards, for her contributions to biosciences, in 2011. She is also a recipient of the Woman Scientist Award of the Biotech Research Society of India and the National Young Woman Bioscientist Award of the Department of Biotechnology which she received in 2006 and 2007 respectively. In 2020, she was awarded the Kalpana Chawla Excellence award, for her contributions in science. This award is instituted in the memory of the first Indian woman astronaut, Kalpana Chawla to go on space missions.

Contributions in structural biology 
Sujata Sharma was the first structural biologist to successfully demonstrate the proteolytic production of N- and C-terminal molecular halves of Lactoferrin, crystallize the C-lobe and determine the three-dimensional structure  Her studies have established the fact that lactoferrin has a direct role in chelating the unbound non-steroidal anti-inflammatory drugs (NSAIDs) which in turn leads to the reduction in the NSAID-induced gastropathy.

The studies on the structure determination of Peptidoglycan Recognition Protein which is a component of the innate immune system and are conserved from insects to mammals, have given a new direction for the development of this protein as a natural protein antibiotic.  The structural studies on the lactoperoxidase system, that is, lactoperoxidase along with its inorganic ion substrates, hydrogen peroxide, and oxidized products have given new insights into the structure-function interrelationships of this antimicrobial protein. Her structural studies on SPX-40 have demonstrated that the molecule acts as a protective signalling factor for breast cancer cells and have validated this protein as a drug target for breast cancer. She has also been involved in the designing of inhibitors, both small organic and inorganic compounds and peptides, against these protein targets. She has successfully demonstrated the potency of these ligands in several animal models.

Awards and honours 
 TWAS Regional Awards in Public Understanding and Popularization of Science in 2021
 Kalpana Chawla Excellence award in 2020
 National Bioscience Award for Career Development in 2011. 
 National Young Woman Bioscientist Award of the Department of Biotechnology in  2007
 Woman Scientist Award of the Biotech Research Society of India in 2006

Books

See also 

 Lactoferrin
 Haem peroxidase
 Lactoperoxidase

Notes

References

External links 
 

N-BIOS Prize recipients
Indian scientific authors
Living people
Indian medical researchers
Scientists from Delhi
Indian biophysicists
All India Institute of Medical Sciences, New Delhi alumni
Academic staff of the All India Institute of Medical Sciences, New Delhi
Medical doctors from Delhi
1970 births